is a Japanese professional radio-controlled car racer from Yokohama, Kanagawa Prefecture. He has won two IFMAR titles and a number of domestic ROAR and JMRCA titles.

Regarded as one of the biggest drivers in R/C racing at the time, he is not the only driver to successfully cross-discipline multiples of racing categories but to win world championship in both on and off-road and electric and nitro powered cars.

Complete R/C Racing summary 
Bold on results indicates top qualifier

IFMAR World Championship results

FEMCA Championship

ROAR National Championships

JMRCA All-Japan Championship results 
A non-first-place finisher highlighted in gold indicates that despite being won by an invited foreign driver, the championship is awarded to the best native driver.

DHI Cup

References

RIDE Racing Team profile

External links
Official site

RC car racing drivers
1979 births
Living people
Sportspeople from Yokohama
Radio-controlled car personalities
Hobby Products International